George Bean may refer to:
 George Bean (cricketer) (1864–1923), English cricketer
 George Bean (judge) (1915–1973), British barrister and judge
 George Ewart Bean (1903–1977), English archaeologist and writer
 George Bean (1805–1869), South Australian businessman, see Bean Brothers
 George Thomas Bean (1845–1912), South Australian businessman, son of the above, see Bean Brothers